Bethlehem Church, also known as Bethlehem United Church of Christ, is a historic United Church of Christ church located at Broadway, Rockingham County, Virginia. It was built in 1844–1845, and is a small, one-story, gable-roofed limestone structure.  It measures 42 feet, 6 inches, by 32 feet, 6 inches.  The original vaulted ceiling and gable roof were destroyed during the American Civil War. The present gable roof was built in 1914.  It was used as the primary church until a new church was constructed in 1952.

It was listed on the National Register of Historic Places in 1985.

References

Stone churches in Virginia
United Church of Christ churches in Virginia
Churches on the National Register of Historic Places in Virginia
Churches completed in 1845
Buildings and structures in Rockingham County, Virginia
National Register of Historic Places in Rockingham County, Virginia
Limestone churches in the United States
1845 establishments in Virginia